Eighty-five tropical or subtropical cyclones have affected the state of New York since the 17th century. The state of New York is located along the East Coast of the United States, in the Northeastern portion of the country. The strongest of these storms was the 1938 New England hurricane, which struck Long Island as a Category 3 storm on the Saffir–Simpson hurricane scale. Killing more than 60 people, it was also the deadliest. Tropical cyclones have affected the state primarily in September but have also hit during every month of the hurricane season, June through November. Tropical cyclones rarely make landfall on the state, although it is common for remnants of tropical cyclones to produce heavy rainfall and flooding.

Before 1800 
 Between 1278 and 1438: A major hurricane struck the modern-day New York/New Jersey area.
 August 25, 1635: A hurricane that is reported to have tracked parallel to the East Coast impacts New England and New York, although it remains unknown if any damage occurred.
 September 8, 1667: A 'severe storm' is reported in Manhattan and is reported to be a continuation of a powerful hurricane which affected the Mid-Atlantic.
 October 29, 1693: The Great Storm of 1693 causes severe damage on Long Island, and is reported to create the Fire Island Cut as a result of the coast-changing storm surge and waves.
 September 23, 1785: Several large ships crash into Governors Island as a result of powerful waves which are reported to have been generated by a tropical cyclone.
 August 19, 1788: A hurricane strikes New York City or Long Island and is reported to have left the west side of the Battery "laid in ruins" after severe flooding occurs.

1800–1899 

 October 9, 1804: Heavy snow falls in Eastern New York peaking at 30 inches (75 cm) as a hurricane tracks northward along the East Coast and becomes extratropical, as cold air fed into the system.
 September 5, 1815: A hurricane tracks over North Carolina and parallels the East Coast before producing a heavy rainstorm in New York.
 September 24, 1815: Several hundred trees fall and the majority of the fruit was stripped off apple trees just prior to harvesting time after a hurricane makes landfall on Long Island.
 September 16, 1816: A possible hurricane strikes New York City, but damage remains unknown.
 August 9, 1817: A tropical storm produces heavy rainfall in New York City and Long Island.
 September 3, 1821: The 1821 Norfolk and Long Island hurricane results in severe damage on Long Island and is accompanied by storm surge of 13 feet (4 m). High wind causes a ship to crash on Long Island killing 17 people.
 June 4, 1825: A hurricane moves off the East Coast and tracks south of New York causing several ship wrecks, and killing seven people.
 August 27, 1827: High tides are reported in New York City which are caused by a hurricane offshore.
 August 1, 1830: A hurricane passes to the east of New York and produces gale-force winds to New York City and Long Island.
 October 4, 1841: Gale–force winds affect New York City as a hurricane tracks north along the East Coast of the United States. Damage is estimated at $2 million (1841 USD, $41 million 2007 USD).
 October 13, 1846: The Great Havana Hurricane of 1846 tracks inland, causing  some damage to New York City.
 October 6, 1849: Severe structural damage occurs in New York City and Long Island with the passage of a hurricane to the east.
 July 19, 1850: A hurricane destroys a Coney Island bath house and causes heavy rain, although damage is unknown. This storm destroyed the ship Elizabeth off Fire Island and drowned American transcendentalist Margaret Fuller.
 August 24, 1850: A storm that is reported to be a hurricane affects New York and New England although there is no known damage.
 September 9, 1854: A hurricane brushes the East Coast from Florida to New England causing rain on Long Island.
 September 16, 1858: Low barometric pressure of 28.87 inches mercury at Sag Harbor is reported, and is thought to be associated with a tropical cyclone which causes no known damage.
 September 6, 1869: A category 3 hurricane makes landfall in Rhode Island and brushes Long Island, which is affected by rain, although minimal damage resulted from the storm.
 October 28, 1872: A tropical storm passes over New York City and Long Island.
 October 1, 1874: New York City and the Hudson Valley receives rainfall after a minimal tropical storm tracked over Eastern New York.
 September 19, 1876: The remnants of the San Felipe hurricane track over western New York State, although damage is unknown.
 October 24, 1878: The state is affected by tropical storm-force winds and heavy rain with the passage of a hurricane, which made landfall in Virginia.
 August 22, 1888: A tropical storm tracks over New York City before tracking north along the East Coast of the United States.
 August 24, 1893: Hog Island is washed away by strong storm surge associated with a tropical storm of unknown strength. According to HURDAT, this was a Category 1 hurricane that struck the western end of the Rockaway Peninsula, passing through Brooklyn as a weakening hurricane. Manhattan Island saw gale-force winds to 56 mph.
 August 29, 1893: | Sea Islands hurricane moves thorough the Hudson Valley as a tropical storm. Lives were lost in the Rockaways and when tow boats were destroyed at various points along the Hudson River. Roofs, structures, boats and crops were destroyed or damaged from Brooklyn to as far west as Dunkirk. Winds of 54 and 57 MPH recorded in New York and Albany respectively.
 October 10, 1894: 10 People were killed and 15 injured at 74 Monroe Street in Manhattan when winds blew a building under construction onto a tenement crushing it. Extensive damage in the NYC and Long Island to telegraph lines, trees and boats docked on shore. Storm formed over Gulf of Mexico as a Category 3 weakened over land in the Southeast and re strengthened to a Category 1 over the Chesapeake Bay before striking Long Island.

1900–1949 

 September 12, 1900 – Remnants of the Galveston hurricane brought tropical storm conditions to New York City and Brooklyn killing one person and damaging property.
 September 17, 1903: The 1903 Vagabond Hurricane produces wind gusts in excess of 65 mph (105 km/h) and 3 inches (75 mm) of rain in Central Park.
 August 15, 1904: A Category 2 hurricane skirts the East Coast of the United States producing gale-force winds and heavy rain in Eastern New York and Long Island.
 August 2, 1908: A hurricane develops near North Carolina and moves northward along the coast, brushing Long Island.
 July 21, 1916: Strong winds are reported on Long Island as a category 1 hurricane passes to the east.
 August 25, 1933: The 1933 Chesapeake–Potomac hurricane produces up to 6 inches (150 mm) of rain in Southeast New York State; other damage is unknown.
 September 8, 1934: A strong tropical storm makes landfall on Long Island.
 September 20, 1936: Strong waves and storm surge associated with a powerful hurricane floods much of Long Beach Island and causes severe beach erosion along the coast.
 September 21, 1938: The New England hurricane of 1938 (also called "The Long Island Express") makes landfall on Suffolk County (Long Island) as a category 3 hurricane on the Saffir–Simpson hurricane scale. In New York  60 deaths and hundreds of injuries were attributed to the storm. In addition, 2,600 boats and 8,900 houses are destroyed. Throughout New England the hurricane killed over 682 people, damaged or destroyed over 57,000 homes, and caused property losses estimated at $4.7 billion (2005 US dollars).
Wind gusts of well over  breaks previous wind records in New York City, while a minimum pressure reading of 28.47 inches is recorded on Long Island. 117 homes are completely destroyed, while 2,427 are severely damaged and almost 1000 businesses are destroyed or damaged. In all, six people are killed, and one person is injured.
 September 18, 1945: A weak tropical depression crosses into Southeastern New York.
 August 29, 1949: A tropical storm tracks into Central New York causing no known damage.

1950–1974 

On eastern Long Island near where Carol made landfall, a pressure of 960 mbar is recorded. The hurricane's storm surge covers the Montauk Highway in Montauk, effectively isolating eastern Long Island for a period of time. Due to the compact nature of the storm, most of Long Island is largely unaffected by the hurricane. Specific damage totals for New York are unknown, although the storm in its entirety causes $460 million (1954 USD) in damage.
 September 10, 1954: Hurricane Edna tracks to the east of Long Island producing 9 inches (230 mm) of rain. Prior to the storm, New York City orders an emergency standby for the majority of its hospitals, and subways.
 October 15, 1954: Hurricane Hazel—wind gust of 113 mph at Battery Park, highest ever recorded in New York City.  
 August 13, 1955: Hurricane Connie produces 13.24 inches (370 mm) of rain in Southeast New York, although damage is unknown.
 September 28, 1956: Hurricane Flossy tracks to the south of Long Island, brushing it with light rainfall.
 October 1, 1959: The remnants of Hurricane Gracie track into Central New York and drops up to 6 inches (150 mm) of rain.
 September 11, 1960: Hurricane Donna makes landfall on Long Island as a Category 2 hurricane. Strong waves also cause beach erosion and several homes along the shore to be destroyed. Due to well-executed warnings, damages are extremely low, and it is reported that no deaths result from the storm.
 September 21, 1961: Hurricane Esther causes $3 million (1961 USD, $20 million 2007 USD) in damage in Suffolk County as it tracks to the east of Long Island.
 October 8, 1962: Hurricane Daisy tracks east of New England, producing light rainfall in extreme eastern portions of Upstate New York.
 September 23, 1964: Beach erosion and moderate wind gusts are reported on Long Island as Hurricane Gladys tracks a couple hundred miles south of New York.
 October 19, 1964: Light rainfall is reported as Hurricane Isbell tracks off the coast.
 September 10, 1969: Rainfall up to 3 inches (75 mm) is reported on Long Island and in portions of Southeastern New York associated with Hurricane Gerda.
 August 28, 1971: Tropical Storm Doria produces up to 8 inches (200 mm) of rain in New York City and Upstate New York causing moderate to severe flooding and floods subways in New York City.
 June 22, 1972: Hurricane Agnes makes landfall near New York City and produces up to 12 inches (300 mm) of rain in Southeastern New York State and much of Western New York, with locally higher amounts. Storm tides of 3.1 feet (1 m) and wind gusts of  occur in New York City, and severe river flooding causes 24 deaths.

1975–1999 
 August 11, 1976: Hurricane Belle makes landfall on Long Island as a Category 1 hurricane on the Saffir–Simpson hurricane scale, producing up to 6 inches (150 mm) of rain. 30,000 people are evacuated in New York in anticipation of Belle. Wind gusts of up to 70 mph and tides of 7.2 feet (2.3 m) above normal are reported in New York City and Long Island. Moderate river flooding occurs, as well as minor crop damage. In all, one person is killed by a falling tree, and damage is reported at $257 million (1976 USD, $980 million 2007 USD).
 September 1, 1978: The remnants of Tropical Storm Debra produces light rainfall along the southern edge of New York State.
 September 7, 1979: The remnants of Hurricane David produce light to moderate rainfall up to 3 inches (75 mm) in much of New York State.
 September 2, 1983: Tropical Storm Dean produces light rain near New York City and causes minor beach erosion.
 Late October 1984: The remnants of a tropical depression track just north of New York City, producing extremely light showers.
 July 1985: The remnants of Hurricane Bob produce light rainfall in Southeastern New York.
 September 25, 1985: The remnants of Tropical Storm Henri produce light rain in isolated areas.

 September 27, 1985: Hurricane Gloria makes landfall on Long Island as a Category 2 hurricane. In addition, 48 homes on Long Island were destroyed, and hundreds more were damaged.
 September 10, 1987: Tropical Depression Eleven produces rainfall up to 3 inches (75 mm) in much of New York State.
 August 30, 1988: Tropical Storm Chris produces moderate rainfall in Upstate New York.
 September 24, 1989: The remnants of Hurricane Hugo produce light rain and gusty winds in Central and Eastern New York.
 August 19, 1991: Hurricane Bob comes within a short distance of making landfall on the eastern tip of Long Island as a category 2 hurricane. Heavy rainfall up to 7 inches (175 mm) and high wind gusts causes two deaths and $75 million (1991 USD, $117 million 2007 USD), as well as severe beach erosion which came as a result of storm surge up to 6 feet (2 m) above average.
 October 30, 1991: The 1991 Perfect Storm kills one man when he is swept off a bridge, and causes moderate to severe beach erosion.
 August 28, 1992: The remnants of Hurricane Andrew produce light rainfall in the western portions of the state.

 September 27, 1992: Tropical Storm Danielle produces light rain in Western New York.
 July 22, 1994: Tropical Depression Two produces light rain in isolated areas of the state and generates thunderstorms which down several trees.
 August 18, 1994: Tropical Storm Beryl's remnants produce up to 3 inches (75 mm) of rain in Central New York causing moderate flooding which causes two fatalities and $1.5 million (1994 USD, $21 million 2007 USD) in damage, and 14 homes are damaged or destroyed. In addition, State Route 7 was closed for several hours due to flooding.
 July 13, 1996: Hurricane Bertha makes landfall on Long Island as a tropical storm, producing heavy rainfall which caused moderate flooding in the lower Hudson Valley in addition to tropical storm-force winds.
 July 24, 1997: Hurricane Danny causes light rainfall over New York City and Long Island.
 September 8, 1999: The remnants of Hurricane Dennis produce bands of heavy rain which caused some flooding, especially in Rockland County where three feet of flood water accumulated in some locations.
 September 16, 1999: Hurricane Floyd produces rainfall up to 13 inches (325 mm) and wind gusts of up to  affect Southeastern New York. Severe flooding results from the storm, killing two people and causing an early estimate of $14.6 million (1997 USD, $18 million 2007 USD), although it is reported that damage could total to far more than that. One of the deaths occurred when a person was swept into a flooded river.

2000–2009 

 September 20, 2000: The remnants of Hurricane Gordon produce light rainfall in Southeastern New York State.
 June 17, 2001: The remnants of Tropical Storm Allison produce moderate rainfall up to 3 inches (75 mm), although it fell in just a couple hours causing minor to moderate flash flooding.
 August 10, 2002: Tropical Storm Cristobal generates rip currents which drown three people on the coast of Long Island.
 September 28, 2002: The remnants of Hurricane Isidore produce widespread light rainfall over much of the state and moderate wind gusts. Some small trees are blown down, and minor power outages are reported.
 September 21, 2003: Hurricane Isabel affects the state with high winds and flooding. Damage in New York totals to $90 million (2003 USD, $98 million 2006 USD). In and around New York City, about 1.1 million customers were left without power, though most outages were fixed by the day after the hurricane passed through the region. Offshore of Long Beach, rough waves killed a man while bodysurfing.
 August 4, 2004: Hurricane Alex drops 2.83 inches (70 mm) of rain on Long Island.
 August 13, 2004: Tropical Storm Bonnie produces rainfall peaking at 4 inches causing several rivers to swell to at or slightly above flood stage.
 August 14, 2004: Hurricane Charley brushes Long Island and produces light rainfall.
 September 4, 2004: Hurricane Gaston produces light rainfall on Long Island.
 September 9, 2004: The remnants of Hurricane Frances produces heavy rainfall up to 7 inches (175 mm) which causes extensive flooding in central New York. One death from drowning and $6 million (2005 USD, $6.5 million 2007 USD) in damage resulted from the flooding.
 July 9, 2005: The remnants of Hurricane Cindy produce moderate rainfall in Upstate New York causing light damage due to flooding and gusty winds, which downed some trees.
 August 30, 2005: The remnants of Hurricane Katrina produce heavy rainfall up to 5 inches (125 mm) of rain in the western portion of the state. High winds also affect the state, with 4,500 people in Buffalo left without power after high winds downed trees and power lines.
 October 5, 2005: Tropical Storm Tammy's remnants contribute to a rainstorm which turns into the Northeast U.S. flooding of October 2005. Up to 13 inches (325 mm) of rain cause severe flooding throughout the Hudson Valley, causing no deaths in the state, but millions of dollars in damage throughout the country.
Numerous trees and power lines are reported fallen, and several thousand people are left without power, primarily in the New York City area.
 June 5, 2007: Tropical Storm Barry produces 3.91 inches (99 mm) of rain in New York City. The heavy rainfall leads to flooding in the Finger Lakes region of New York State, washing out roads and driveways. Roads and several driveways were washed out.
Aside from numerous downed trees, damage was minimal.
 August 22, 2009: Offshore Hurricane Bill causes severe beach erosion and coastal damage on the southern shore of Long Island.

2010–2019 

Storm surge reached underneath the boardwalks in both Coney Island and Long Beach. and the Hudson River also flooded. Top recorded winds reached 70 mph at the height of the storm and left 400,000 without power. The storm also killed five people in the state and had a major impact on Upstate NY. The storm caused the National Weather Service in Albany, New York to issue a Tropical Storm Warning for the local forecast area. This had never been done before, and actually required a breach in protocol to achieve. Prior to this event, the Albany, New York forecast area was considered outside of the valid area for Tropical Storm warnings.
 October 28–29, 2012: Hurricane Sandy, a historic storm, makes landfall near Atlantic City, New Jersey with 80 mph winds. This storm was unusual because it was a late season hurricane combined with a Nor'easter at high tide during a full moon, producing long-lasting and devastating results not seen in generations. The largest hurricane ever recorded in the Atlantic Basin, wind gusts topped  in some parts of the New York metropolitan area. Sandy was not a hurricane when it hit the NY-CT region. Sandy caused a record  storm surge at Battery Park, New York City, flooding various parts of Lower Manhattan including various tunnels and subway systems, making them inoperable for weeks. As of late 2019 some are still damaged and are in the process of being repaired, with projects like 14th Street Tunnel shutdown. The immediate aftermath included widespread flooding, massive power outages and a system-wide disruption of mass transit service. Sandy had a significant effect on the digital world: the Federal Communications Commission estimated that the hurricane...also disrupted cable TV, broadband Internet and landline phone service for 25 percent of customers in the affected areas." Over nine million customers were without power, including 90 percent of Long Island and most of Manhattan below 49th Street, some for several months. Many low-lying neighborhoods in NJ and NY were completely destroyed. Thousands of homes and businesses were demolished by the record storm surge.
 July 4, 2014: Hurricane Arthur passes to the southeast of New York, producing light to moderate rainfall along the coast; however, winds remain generally below tropical storm force. Some holiday celebrations in the New York metropolitan area were canceled or postponed.
 June 21–22, 2015: The remnants of Tropical Storm Bill pass through Upstate New York, producing heavy rain.
 May 28, 2016: Tropical Storm Bonnie brings heavy rain up to the Northeast coast.
 October 9–10, 2016: Hurricane Matthew interacts with a frontal system, bringing heavy rain and minor flooding to the state.
 June 19, 2017: The remnants of Tropical Storm Cindy producing severe thunderstorms and EF-0 tornadoes around the Tri-State Area.
 August 18, 2017: The remnants of Hurricane Gert cause flash flooding on Long Island.
 September 19–20, 2017: Tropical Storm Jose passes Long Island closely, producing heavy wind and rain.
 September 27, 2017: Hurricane Maria brings showers and some gusty winds to the shore.
 October 28–30, 2017: Tropical Storm Philippe interacts with a low-pressure system, bringing high winds and heavy rain to the Northeast.
 September 8–9, 2018: The remnants of Tropical Storm Gordon which had previously been absorbed by another system bring minor flooding to NYC
 October 11–12, 2018: Hurricane Michael interacts with a cold front and brings heavy rain and gusty winds to NYC and Long Island.
 September 6–7, 2019: Hurricane Dorian prompted rip current warnings and predicted swells of up to 10 feet, which caused the New York City Department of Parks and Recreation to announce that all city beaches would be closed to swimming and surfing, due to the dangerous conditions as an effect from the hurricane.

2020–present 
 July 10–11, 2020: Tropical Storm Fay made landfall in New Jersey, and then traveled northwestward into New York. In Long Beach, New York, a 19-year-old drowned after being caught in rip currents related to Fay. He was with five other swimmers, who were rescued after also being caught in the rip currents. The storm flooded several New York City Subway stations.
 August 4, 2020: Tropical Storm Isaias brought 3 to 6 inches (76.2 – 152.4 mm) of rain with wind gusts of 50 to 80 mph, (80 km/h To 130 km/h) with peak gusts of 78 mph (125.5 km/h) recorded at Republic Airport in Farmingdale and 70 mph (112 km/h) at JFK in Queens. New York City's Flash Flood Emergency plan was activated by New York Emergency Management, due to the minor-moderate risk of storm surge impacting South Street Seaport in Lower Manhattan.  On August 3, 2020, a Tropical Storm Warning was issued by the National Weather Service as well as a travel advisory that evening by NY Emergency Management, stating that the strongest of the storm would be from 12 PM to 2 PM (EST) on August 4. A Tornado watch was issued for the area on the morning of August 4. Multiple trees fell damaging several homes, as well as leaving 2.5 million people without power across the tristate area.
 August 31, 2020: The remnants of Hurricane Laura fuel isolated severe thunderstorms, prompting watches and warnings.
 October 12, 2020: The remnants of Hurricane Delta cause light rainfall in New York City.
 October 28–30, 2020: Outer rainbands of extratropical Hurricane Zeta causes rain and snow in portions of New York.
 July 9, 2021: Hurricane Elsa brings heavy rain and flooding across the northeast and turned extratropical as it heads for Canada. Several subway stations and roads across Manhattan and the Bronx flooded both due to the thunderstorm on July 8 and the actual tropical storm on July 9.
 August 18, 2021: The remnants of Tropical Storm Fred causes flooding across New York, and Auburn, New York recorded  of rain.
 August 22, 2021: Hurricane Henri passes just east of Montauk Point as a tropical storm, but pummels Long Island and New York City with heavy rain. Most of Montauk shut down due to the hurricane.
 September 1, 2021: The remnants of Hurricane Ida reached the New York City metro area, with heavy rainfall and flooding, a Tornado Watch was issued for the area. As the storm forced most of the subway system to shut down with many flooded stations. For the first time in the history of the city, New York City was put under a Flash Flood Emergency. It is estimated that 16 people died in the state, 13 of those in New York City, including 11 from apartment basements flooding.
 October 26, 2021: A Nor'easter brings high winds and heavy rainfall across northeast which would later form into Tropical Storm Wanda. One person died due to the nor’easter due to drowning in the Long Island Sound.
 October 1-5, 2022: Extratropical remnants of Hurricane Ian brought rain and gusty winds across the Tri-State area, including New York. The remnant low-pressure area of Ian stalled off the coast of New York and New Jersey for nearly a week.
 November 11, 2022: The remnants of Hurricane Nicole spreads heavy rain and gusty winds across New York.

Listed by month

Deadly storms 
The following table includes all storms which caused fatalities in New York State.

See also 

 List of New Jersey hurricanes
 List of New England hurricanes
 List of Pennsylvania hurricanes
 List of North Carolina hurricanes
 List of Florida hurricanes
 New York Harbor Storm-Surge Barrier

References

External links 
 National Hurricane Center
 National Climatic Data Center

Lists of tropical cyclones in the United States
Hurricanes| New York Hurricanes| Meteorology
Hurricanes